Robert Ellison Brockie  (born 1932 in Christchurch) is a New Zealand cartoonist, scientist, columnist and graphic artist.

He was an editorial cartoonist for the National Business Review from 1975 to 2018, specialising in political satire. As a biologist he is interested in animal populations, animal behaviour and diseases and did his PhD on hedgehog ecology. He has published material on butterfly evolution in Sicily, behaviour of sparrows, magpies, possums, starlings, mange mites, animal roadkill, flax flowering, cabbage tree disease.

He was science columnist for Wellington's Dominion Post newspaper from 2001 to 2018.

Brockie takes a strong interest in refuting popular myths, like danger to humans from 1080 poison used to control possum populations.

Brockie is a member of New Zealand Skeptics.

In the 2013 Queen's Birthday Honours, Brockie was appointed a Member of the New Zealand Order of Merit, for services to science and cartooning. He was elected a Companion of the Royal Society of New Zealand, but resigned his companionship in 2022. He has twice been named New Zealand Cartoonist of the Year.

In 2018, Brockie was dropped from the Fairfax Media chain and  the National Business Review for his positions on the Treaty of Waitangi and climate change.

Selected bibliography
 I was there!: dramatic first-hand accounts from New Zealand’s history
 City Nature: Everyday Plants and Animals in NZ Cities
 Dr Bob's amazing nature facts
 Brockie’s Bones of contention: a selection of cartoons,  
 
 Don't Vote – It Only Encourages Them
 
 A Living New Zealand Forest: A Community of Plants and Animals  (1992), David Bateman Publishing, presents results of a 25-year study of the Orongorongo range near Wellington
 Brockie, Bob, Brockie: A Memoir in Words, Cartoons & Sketches (2015), Fraser Books,

References

External links 
 View cartoons by Bob Brockie on DigitalNZ.

1932 births
Living people
New Zealand cartoonists
New Zealand sceptics
Members of the New Zealand Order of Merit